Pahang FM (stylised as PAHANG fm) is a Malay language-radio station in the state of Pahang, Malaysia. It is maintained by the State Radio Televisyen Malaysia Pahang. It is broadcast from Kuala Lumpur throughout several of the country's cities.

History 
A radio station was established in Pahang on July 1966 by the Government of Malaysia. In an effort to expand coverage in these areas, the station transmitting Kuala Lipis established in 1974 and completed in Depok on the year 1977. RTM, however transmission station in Jerantut AM 846 kHz is not connected to the RTM release Kuantan and eastern districts, with headquarters in Kuala Terengganu RTM instead just connect directly from the National Network RTM Kuala Lumpur.

Stations Jerantut was closed on 1 April 1991. FM transmitting station was launched in Depok then connected to the RTM Kuantan broadcast. Recognising the power transmission capacity in just 10 Kilowatt Station Kuantan, then set up FM transmitters in Bukit Pelindung Mono Kuantan at the end of the year 1990 and in turn Bentung Gunung Ulu Kali in 1991.

With OLTE system (Optical Line Terminal) installed on 15 October 1992. All broadcasts are received in monaural able to be followed in FM Stereo, almost the entire state can follow the travelling Pahang Kuantan.

Frequency

References

External links 
 

1992 establishments in Malaysia
Radio stations established in 1992
Radio stations in Malaysia
Malay-language radio stations
Radio Televisyen Malaysia